TransUnion CIBIL Limited is a credit information company operating in India. It maintains credit files on 600 million individuals and 32 million businesses. TransUnion is one of four credit bureaus operating in India and is part of TransUnion, an American multinational group.

Consumer Credit Reporting

Trans Union CIBIL aggregates consumer borrowing and payment information for the purpose of assessing loan risk and pricing credit (setting the interest rate). It has partnered with Chicago-based TransUnion.

Consumer credit scores are also used in unemployment decisions, although there are no studies in India showing that impaired credit leads to employee misconduct and unemployment.

Business Credit Reporting

TransUnion CIBIL aggregates business financial and payment information for the purpose of assessing loan risk and pricing credit (setting the interest rate. It has partnered with New Jersey based Dun and Bradstreet. D&B maintains files on 150 million business worldwide.

CIBIL Full Form 
CIBIL is fully known as Credit Information Bureau (India) Limited

What is CIBIL Score? 
CIBIL score is a bank's assessment of a client's trustworthiness based on information from their credit history. The higher the score, the more favourable the bank is to the client. It is a 3-digit number ranging between 300 and 900. Ideally, 720 or above score considered as a good CIBIL score.

CRIF vs. CIBIL 
Banks and financial organisations widely use CRIF and CIBIL. Both of them are more or less the same. So let's have a comparative analysis of CRIF and CIBIL

CRIF Credit Scores:

CIBIL Credit Scores:

Competition
Competitors to TransUnion CIBIL include:
 CRIF High Mark
 Equifax
 Experian

History

 2000: CIBIL (Credit Information Bureau (India) Limited) incorporated.
 2004: Credit bureau services are launched in India (Consumer Bureau).
 2006: Commercial bureau operations commenced.
 2007: CIBIL Score, India’s first generic risk scoring model for banks and financial institutions, was introduced.
 2010: Two firsts for the credit industry in India with the launch of:
 CIBIL Detect: India's first repository for information on high-risk activity.
 CIBIL Mortgage Check: The first centralized database on mortgages in India.
 2011: CIBIL Score is made available to individual consumers.
 2016: Transunion acquired 92.1% stake in CIBIL to become Transunion CIBIL.
 2017: TransUnion CIBIL launches CIBIL MSME Rank to drive credit penetration in Micro, Small and Medium Enterprises and helping lenders assess risk better 
2017: Bank of India sold its 5% share in the company for  Rs190.6 crore, implying a value of US$592 million for TransUnion CIBIL

References

External links
Official Website

Financial services companies based in Mumbai
Financial services companies established in 2000
2016 mergers and acquisitions
Indian subsidiaries of foreign companies
Indian companies established in 2000
2000 establishments in Maharashtra